"Here for You" is a song by Slovene duo Maraaya. It was written by Raay, Marjetka Vovk and Charlie Mason. This is their second single released on 28 February 2015 at the Slovenia in the Eurovision Song Contest 2015 final night. The song represented Slovenia in the Eurovision Song Contest 2015.

Success 

They represented Slovenia in the Eurovision Song Contest 2015 with their second single "Here for You". They performed in the second semi final where the song gathered 92 points and earned 5th place. In the grand final the song received 39 points and was 14th.

Peak positions at the official singles charts: it was ranked on 1st place at the Slovenian SloTop50 chart, on 23rd at the Austrian Ö3 Austria Top 40 chart, on 24th at the Slovakian Rádio Top 100 chart, on 48th at the Belgian (Flanders) Ultratip 100 chart, on 10th at the Swedish Sverigetopplistan Heatseekers chart and on 18th at the Finnish Suomen virallinen lista digital chart. This song was top peak position at the German Hitfire singles chart.

Formats and track listing 

Slovenia" CD Maxi promo single
"Here for You" (Radio Edit) – 3:24
"Here for You" (Tomec & Grabber Guitar Alternative) – 3:58
"Here for You" (Rasmus Vienna Remix) – 4:06
"Here for You" (featuring Perpetuum Jazzie) – 3:00
"Here for You" (Maraaya & Popsing) – 4:06
"Here for You" (Instrumental) – 4:06
"Here for You" (Rasmus Vienna Remix Instrumental) – 4:06
"Here for You" (3 Min Esc Version) – 2:59
"Here for You" (Esc Karaoke + Key Intro) – 3:03
"Lovin' Me" (Radio Edit) – 3:49

Personnel

Main 
 Raay - music, lyrics, arrangement, producer
 Marjetka Vovk - music, lead vocal
 Charlie Mason - lyrics
 Art Hunter - arrangement
 Tomass Snare - arrangement

Others 
 Manca Špik - backing vocals
 Nika Zorjan - backing vocals
 Karin Zemljič - backing vocals
 Lara Balodis Slekovec - air violin

Charts

Weekly charts

Year-end charts

Release history

References 

Eurovision songs of Slovenia
Eurovision songs of 2015
2015 songs
2015 singles
Songs with lyrics by Charlie Mason (lyricist)